IYC may refer to:
Ijaw Youth Council, a civil rights organization in Nigeria
Indian Youth Congress, a body of the Indian National Congress Party
International Year of Chemistry, a United Nations year of observance
Inverness Yacht Club (California), a pleasure boating club located in Inverness, California
Island Yacht Club, in Toronto, Ontario Canada